The Embassy of Armenia in Cairo is the diplomatic mission of the Armenia to the Arab Republic of Egypt. The chancery is located at 20 Mohamed Mazhar street, Zamalek, Cairo. The embassy also covers the countries of Sudan, Libya, and South Africa as part of its mandate.

The first ambassador of Armenia to Egypt was Dr. Eduard Nalbandyan (1992–1999) who was followed by Dr. Sergey Manassarian (1999–2004) and then by Dr. Rouben Karapetian (2004–2009). From July 22, 2009 to November 2018 Dr. Armen Melkonian was Armenia's 4th ambassador to Egypt. Since November 20, 2018 Mr Karen Grigorian is Ambassador Extraordinary and Plenipotentiary of Armenia to Egypt.

Building history
The embassy is based in a villa with a private garden in the Zamalek district, an affluent area where most embassies are located. The villa designed by local architect A. Antranikian in 1927 and originally belonged to Janik and Satenig Chaker and was donated by the latter to the Cairo branch of AGBU in 1976. Nowadays it is a protected architectural landmark.

See also

 Armenia–Egypt relations
 Foreign relations of Armenia
 List of diplomatic missions of Armenia

References

External links
 The Website of the Embassy
 Ministry of Foreign affairs of Armenia
 AGBU-Egypt Official Site

Diplomatic missions of Armenia
Armenia–Egypt relations
Armenia